Moss-troopers were brigands of the mid-17th century, who operated across the border country between Scotland and the northern English counties of Northumberland and Cumberland during the period of the English Commonwealth, until after the Restoration.

Much like the earlier Border reivers who had operated in the lawless region during the 16th century and were dealt with, moss-troopers do not have a clear genesis. They gradually evolved, or reemerged, from the long running sociopolitical milieu of the Border. Mention of them appears suddenly in historical records and gives the false impression that they appeared suddenly, but the first statute passed to deal with them, the Moss Troopers Act 1662 (13 & 14 Cha. 2. c. 22), notes the moss-troopers to have been a long-running problem.

With the 1662 act about to expire, the Cavalier Parliament passed the  Moss Troopers Act 1666 (18 Cha. 2 c. 3). Under section two of this act, the benefit of clergy was taken away from those convicted, which generally meant a death sentence, or otherwise with judicial discretion, the notorious thieves and spoil-takers in Northumberland or Cumberland were to be transported to America, "there to remaine and not to returne".

Many moss-troopers were disbanded or deserting soldiers from one of the Scottish armies of the Wars of the Three Kingdoms. They had kept their weapons and lived a life of brigandage, attacking both civilians and Parliamentary soldiers for supplies during the Royalist rising of 1653 to 1654 when English Parliamentarian troops under George Monck occupied Scotland. Moss-troopers usually operated in small bands, either on the fringes of the Highlands or in the border regions. Many Highland lairds complained of moss-troopers' cattle-stealing and of how they incurred military reprisals against the Highlands as a whole.

Some moss-troopers may have had a national-political as well as an economic motivation, believing in resisting the Cromwellian occupation of Scotland – much as their Irish contemporaries, the "tories", in part resisted English occupation.

See also
 Rapparees – Irish guerrillas who fought for James II after the Revolution of 1688 and who on his defeat switched to cattle raiding and extorting protection against theft from Ulster Scots merchants and Anglo-Irish landlords. 
 Iain Dubh Camshròn (Sergent Mòr), who fought on after the Jacobite rising of 1745 until his capture at the Raid on Rannoch and execution for cattle raiding in 1753.

References

Former gangs
17th century in Scotland
Gangs in Scotland
Wars of the Three Kingdoms